Cauchas leucocerella is a moth of the Adelidae family. It is found in most of Europe, except Ireland, Great Britain, the Benelux, the Iberian Peninsula, Switzerland, Denmark, Fennoscandia, Estonia and Lithuania.

The wingspan is 9–10 mm.

References

Moths described in 1763
Adelidae
Moths of Europe
Moths of Asia
Taxa named by Giovanni Antonio Scopoli